JS Setoshio (SS-599) is the tenth boat of the s. She was commissioned on 28 February 2007.

Construction and career
Setoshio was laid down at Mitsubishi Heavy Industries Kobe Shipyard on 23 January 2003 and launched on 5 October 2005. She was commissioned on 28 February 2007 and deployed to Yokohama.

On 22 August 2014, she left Yokosuka to participate in the US dispatch training, stayed in the Hawaii area from mid-September to late October to carry out various trainings, and returned to Yokosuka on 22 November.

From 14 January 2021 to 1 April 2021, the submarine participated in a second US dispatch training, which was held in the waters from Japan to the Hawaiian Islands. During the period, with the cooperation of the US Navy, offshore training and facility use training will be conducted to improve tactical skills.

Gallery

Citations

2005 ships
Oyashio-class submarines
Ships built by Mitsubishi Heavy Industries